The 1927–28 Toronto Maple Leafs season was the first under the Maple Leafs name for the Toronto National Hockey League (NHL) franchise. The club finished in fourth to miss the playoffs again.

Offseason
Conn Smythe left his duties as coach at the University of Toronto and became the general manager and coach of the Leafs. Smythe would be general manager for 30 years. Smythe put team captain Bert Corbeau on waivers in October. Corbeau cleared waivers and joined Toronto Ravinia of the Canadian-American Professional Hockey League. Smythe named Hap Day as team captain.

Regular season

Final standings

Record vs. opponents

Schedule and results

Player statistics

Regular season
Scoring

Goaltending

Playoffs
The Maple Leafs did not qualify for the playoffs.

Transactions

May 16, 1927: Acquired Art Duncan from Victoria Cougars (PCHL) for Bill Brydge
October 20, 1927: Lost Free Agent Bert Corbeau to the Toronto Ravinas of the CPHL
October 20, 1927: Acquired Gerry Lowrey from the London Panthers of the CPHL for Albert Pudas
October 26, 1927: Acquired Ed Gorman from the Ottawa Senators for cash
October 27, 1927: Signed Free Agent Art Smith
November 1, 1927: Lost Free Agent Haldor Halderson to the Quebec Castors of the Can-Am League
November 5, 1927: Traded Art Duncan to the Pittsburgh Pirates for cash
December 1, 1927: Acquired Eddie Rodden from the Chicago Black Hawks; Traded Bert McCaffrey to the Pittsburgh Pirates in three-team trade
December 21, 1927: Acquired Jimmy Herbert from the Boston Bruins for Eric Pettinger and $15,000
January 1, 1928: Acquired Benny Grant on loan from the London Panthers of the CPHL for cash
February 8, 1928: Traded George Patterson to the Montreal Canadiens for cash
February 13, 1928: Traded Ed Gorman to the Kitchener Millionaires of the CPHL
April 8, 1928: Acquired Jack Arbour and $12,500 from the Detroit Cougars for Jimmy Herbert
April 16, 1928: Acquired Alex Gray from the New York Rangers for Butch Keeling

See also
1927–28 NHL season

References

 

Toronto Maple Leafs seasons
Toronto
Toronto